The administrative divisions of France are concerned with the institutional and territorial organization of French territory. These territories are located in many parts of the world. There are many administrative divisions, which may have political (local government), electoral (districts), or administrative (decentralized services of the state) objectives. All the inhabited territories are represented in the National Assembly, Senate and Economic and Social Council and their citizens have French citizenship and elect the President of France.

Types of division

Regions, the most integrated territories 

The French Republic is divided into 18 regions: 12 in mainland France and 6 elsewhere (1 in Europe: Corsica; 2 in the Caribbean (the Lesser Antilles): Guadeloupe and Martinique; 1 in South America: French Guiana; and 2 in the Indian Ocean near East Africa: Mayotte and Réunion). They are traditionally divided between the metropolitan regions, located on the European continent, and the overseas regions, located outside the European continent. Both have the same status and form the most integrated part of the French Republic.

Metropolitan regions 
, metropolitan France is divided into the following:

 13 regions, including Corsica; although Corsica is formally a single territorial collectivity, it is considered equivalent to a region (local authority).
 The regions are subdivided into 96 departments (local authority).
 The departments are subdivided into 320 arrondissements (not a public or legal entity).
 The departments are subdivided into 1,995 cantons (not a public or legal entity).
 The departments are subdivided into 34,826 communes (local authority).
 Three urban communes (Paris, Marseille, and Lyon) are further divided into municipal arrondissements. There are 20 arrondissements of Paris, 16 arrondissements of Marseille, and 9 arrondissements of Lyon.
 The city of Marseille is also divided into 8 municipal sectors. Each sector is composed of two arrondissements.
 There are also 710 associated communes, formerly independent communes which were merged with larger communes but have retained some limited degree of autonomy (e.g., the commune of Lomme which was absorbed by Lille in 2000 and transformed into an "associated commune" inside the commune of Lille).

Furthermore, there exist 2,585 intercommunal structures grouping 34,077 communes (93.2% of all the communes of metropolitan France), with 87.4% of the population of metropolitan France living in them. These intercommunal structures are:

 16 urban communities (communautés urbaines, or CU)
 167 agglomeration communities (communautés d'agglomération, or CA)
 2,397 commune communities (communautés de communes, or CC)
 5 Syndicates of New Agglomeration (syndicats d'agglomération nouvelle, or SAN), a category being phased out

Overseas regions 
Five overseas regions (régions d'outre-mer, or ROM), which have the same status as metropolitan regions. The overseas regions are as follows:

 French Guiana
 Guadeloupe
 Martinique
 Mayotte
 Réunion

 Each overseas region is coextensive with an overseas department (département d'outre-mer, or DOM), again with the same status as departments in metropolitan France. The first four overseas departments were created in 1946 and preceded the four overseas regions, Mayotte became a DOM in 2011. The dual structure of overseas region and overseas department, with two separate assemblies administering the same territory, results from the extension of the regional scheme to the overseas departments in the 1970s. Each overseas region or department may transform into a single territorial collectivity, with the merger of the regional and departmental assemblies, which voters in Martinique and French Guiana approved in two referendums in 2010. In Réunion, the creation of a second department for the southern part of the island has been debated for some time.
 The overseas departments are subdivided into 12 arrondissements (Mayotte does not have arrondissements).
 The 12 arrondissements are further subdivided into 153 cantons with Mayotte having another 19 cantons.
 The 172 cantons are composed of 129 communes. (In the five DOM, there are more cantons than communes, unlike in metropolitan France, because many communes are divided into several cantons, whereas in metropolitan France in general cantons are made up of several communes, except in large communes like Toulouse or Lille which are divided into several cantons.)
Furthermore, as of 1 January 2009, there exist 16 intercommunal structures in the overseas departments, grouping 89 communes (79.5% of all the communes of the overseas departments), with 83.2% of the population of the overseas departments living in them intercommunal structures. These intercommunal structures are:
 7 agglomeration communities
 9 commune communities

Overseas collectivities, semi-autonomous territories 

The French Republic includes five overseas collectivities (collectivités d'outre-mer, or COM) with a semi-autonomous status:

 French Polynesia
 Saint Barthélemy
 Saint Martin
 Saint Pierre and Miquelon
 Wallis and Futuna

 French Polynesia (designated as an "overseas country", French: pays d'outre-mer) is divided into 5 administrative subdivisions (subdivisions administratives). For elections, it is divided into six electoral districts (circonscriptions électorales), which differ slightly from the 5 administrative subdivisions. The 5 administrative subdivisions are divided into 48 communes. There also exist some associated communes as in metropolitan France.
 Saint Barthélemy (designated as a "collectivity", French: collectivité) is a new overseas collectivity created on 22 February 2007. It was previously a commune inside the Guadeloupe department. The commune structure was abolished, and Saint Barthélemy is now one of only three permanently inhabited territories of the French Republic with no commune structure. There are no cantons and arrondissements either.
 Saint Martin (designated as a "collectivity", French: collectivité) is also a new overseas collectivity created on 22 February 2007. It was also previously a commune inside the Guadeloupe department. The commune structure was abolished and Saint Martin is now one of only three permanently inhabited territories of the French Republic with no commune structure. There are also no cantons or arrondissements.
 Saint Pierre and Miquelon (designated as a "territorial collectivity", French: collectivité territoriale, the same designation as Corsica, a region and not an overseas collectivity) is divided into 2 communes with no arrondissements or cantons.
 Wallis and Futuna (designated as a "territory", French: territoire) is divided into 3 districts (circonscriptions territoriales), which exactly match the three traditional chiefdoms (royaumes coutumiers) with their traditional kings still at their head, the only kings currently recognized in the French Republic. These 3 districts are Uvea, Sigave, and Alo. Uvea is the most populous and is further divided into 3 wards (districts in French): Hahake, Mua, and Hihifo. Wallis and Futuna is one of only three permanently inhabited territories of the French Republic with no communes (the others being Saint Barthélemy and Saint Martin). It also has no arrondissements or cantons.

New Caledonia, an autonomous territory 
The French Republic includes one autonomous collectivity:

 New Caledonia

New Caledonia's status is unique in the French Republic: it is the only French local government that is not a territorial collectivity (although its subdivisions are territorial collectivities). It is regarded as a sui generis collectivity, which means that local government and parliament have the power to pass and enforce specific laws without seeking the consent of the French Government; unless such laws are declared illegitimate by the Constitutional Council in a specific proceeding brought to the Constitutional Council. As agreed in the 1998 Nouméa Accord, a New Caledonian citizenship was established (in addition to the French citizenship which is kept in parallel, along with the consequent European citizenship) and a self-determination referendum was held in 2018. Two follow-up referendums were held in 2020 and 2021.

 It is divided into 3 provinces.
 The provinces are subdivided into 33 communes.

Territories without civilian population 
These territories have no permanent civilian population. The residents consist of military personnel, scientific researchers, and support staff.

Overseas territory
1 overseas territory (territoire d'outre-mer, or TOM): the French Southern and Antarctic Lands, which have no permanent population and no communes.

 The French Southern and Antarctic Lands are divided into 5 districts (districts in French):

 Adélie Land
 Crozet Islands
 Kerguelen Islands
 Saint Paul Island and Amsterdam Island
 The Scattered Islands (Îles Éparses), a collection of five non-permanently inhabited island groups in the Indian Ocean: Bassas da India, Europa Island, the Glorioso Islands (including Banc du Geyser), Juan de Nova Island, and Tromelin Island. These were previously administered separately but they have been combined into the French Southern and Antarctic Lands since February 2007.

Uninhabited island directly under the authority of the Minister of Overseas France
 Clipperton Island: an uninhabited island in the Pacific Ocean off the coast of Mexico which is directly under the authority of the Minister of the Overseas in Paris (until February 2007 it was administered by the high-commissioner of the French Republic in French Polynesia). Since the Scattered Islands were also combined with the French Southern and Antarctic Lands in February 2007, Clipperton Island is now the only island left in this category.

Territorial collectivities 

French subdivisions that have a (limited) freedom of administration are called territorial collectivities. Among them are regions, departments, communes, overseas collectivities, provinces (only present in New Caledonia), and the territorial collectivity of Corsica which belongs to no category (but is usually grouped with the regions). New Caledonia is unique as it is not a territorial collectivity.

General rules
Citizens from all parts of France, including the overseas administrative divisions, vote in national elections (presidential, legislative), and all of the collectivities are represented in the Senate.

List of departments by region

Metropolitan France 

 Auvergne-Rhône-Alpes
 01 Ain
 03 Allier
 07 Ardèche
 15 Cantal
 26 Drôme
 38 Isère
 42 Loire
 43 Haute-Loire
 63 Puy-de-Dôme
 69D Rhône
 69M Lyon Metropolis
 73 Savoie
 74 Haute-Savoie
 Bourgogne-Franche-Comté
 21 Côte-d'Or
 25 Doubs
 39 Jura
 58 Nièvre
 70 Haute-Saône
 71 Saône-et-Loire
 89 Yonne
 90 Territoire de Belfort
 Brittany (Bretagne)
 22 Côtes-d'Armor
 29 Finistère
 35 Ille-et-Vilaine
 56 Morbihan
 Centre-Val de Loire
 18 Cher
 28 Eure-et-Loir
 36 Indre
 37 Indre-et-Loire
 41 Loir-et-Cher
 45 Loiret
 Corsica (Corse/Corsica)
 2A Corse-du-Sud
 2B Haute-Corse
 Île-de-France
 75 Paris
 77 Seine-et-Marne
 78 Yvelines
 91 Essonne
 92 Hauts-de-Seine
 93 Seine-Saint-Denis
 94 Val-de-Marne
 95 Val-d'Oise
 Grand Est
 08 Ardennes
 10 Aube
 51 Marne
 52 Haute-Marne
 54 Meurthe-et-Moselle
 55 Meuse
 57 Moselle
 67 Bas-Rhin
 68 Haut-Rhin
 88 Vosges
 Hauts-de-France
 02 Aisne
 59 Nord
 60 Oise
 62 Pas-de-Calais
 80 Somme
 Normandy (Normandie)
 14 Calvados
 27 Eure
 50 Manche
 61 Orne
 76 Seine-Maritime
 Nouvelle-Aquitaine
 16 Charente
 17 Charente-Maritime
 19 Corrèze
 23 Creuse
 24 Dordogne
 33 Gironde
 40 Landes
 47 Lot-et-Garonne
 64 Pyrénées-Atlantiques
 79 Deux-Sèvres
 86 Vienne
 87 Haute-Vienne
 Occitanie
 09 Ariège
 11 Aude
 12 Aveyron
 30 Gard
 31 Haute-Garonne
 32 Gers
 34 Hérault
 46 Lot
 48 Lozère
 65 Hautes-Pyrénées
 66 Pyrénées-Orientales
 81 Tarn
 82 Tarn-et-Garonne
 Pays de la Loire
 44 Loire-Atlantique
 49 Maine-et-Loire
 53 Mayenne
 72 Sarthe
 85 Vendée
 Provence-Alpes-Côte d'Azur
 04 Alpes-de-Haute-Provence
 05 Hautes-Alpes
 06 Alpes-Maritimes
 13 Bouches-du-Rhône
 83 Var
 84 Vaucluse

Overseas departments and collectivities 

 Overseas departments (the following are both departments and regions)
 971 Guadeloupe
 972 Martinique
 973 French Guiana
 974 Réunion
 976 Mayotte
 Overseas collectivities
 975 Saint Pierre and Miquelon
 977 Saint Barthélemy
 978 Saint Martin
 986 Wallis and Futuna
 987 French Polynesia (was also given the designation of overseas country)
 Sui generis collectivity
 988 New Caledonia
 Overseas territory
 984 French Southern and Antarctic Lands (including France's Antarctic claim and the Scattered Islands in the Indian Ocean)
 Special status
 989 Clipperton Island

Historical divisions

In the Medieval period, the territory of modern metropolitan France was occupied by a complex mosaic of more or less independent entities. Their gradual incorporation into France may be followed in the article Territorial formation of France.

Historically, France was divided into provinces; see Provinces of France.

See also 
 2009 Mahoran status referendum
 Decentralisation in France
 List of 35 largest French metropolitan areas by population
 Outre-mer
 Overseas collectivity
 Overseas department and region
 Overseas France
 Overseas Territories of France (European Parliament constituency)
 Overseas territory
 Special member state territories and the European Union
 Zone d'études et d'aménagement du territoire (ZEAT), the eight statistical divisions of metropolitan (mainland) France

References

External links 
 Local websites by region

 
France
Lists of subdivisions of France